Sternhydrus is a genus of beetles in the family Dytiscidae. They are found in Australia, New Guinea, and Buru Island. The genus contains the following four species:

 Sternhydrus atratus (Fabricius, 1801)
 Sternhydrus gibbosus (Wilke, 1920)
 Sternhydrus kolbei (Wilke, 1920)
 Sternhydrus toxopei (Zimmermann, 1925)

References

Dytiscidae